JCreator is a Java IDE created by Xinox Software.  Its interface is similar to that of Microsoft's Visual Studio.  Because it is programmed entirely in C++, (except the first version (0.1), which was Java-based ), Xinox Software has asserted that JCreator is faster than competing Java-based Java IDEs.

JCreator has three editions:
 Lite Edition (LE): shareware that costs $35 after a 30-day trial.
 Pro Edition (Pro): shareware that costs $79 after a 30-day trial.
 Lite-Pro Edition (LE-PRO).
JCreator is only available on the Windows operating system. However, both the LE and Pro versions of JCreator run adequately on Linux (using Wine).  So far no Linux versions are planned for immediate release, but new components will be built for cross-compatibility in mind.

The feature set of the Pro version is comparable to that of other language aware IDEs with respect to project management and editing features, but lacks advanced features, such as automated refactoring, support for common frameworks etc., which can be found in the dominant Java IDEs such as Eclipse and IntelliJ IDEA. The free LE version further lacks some features, such as code completion, that are included with other free IDEs. Unlike the dominant Java IDEs today, JCreator also lacks the level of extensibility through third-party plugins that is common in popular Java IDEs.

Disadvantages
 Only available for the Windows operating system, although Wine can be used to run JCreator on Unix systems.
 When using the JDK Help feature, the default browser settings may not be honored when opening an external browser for the JDK documentation.
 It will mostly open Internet Explorer and rarely a default browser not Internet Explorer.
 No option for temporary highlighting of files.
 XML highlighting disables itself with really long lines.
 Custom icons can only be made from 16 colors.
 There is a workaround by saving the bitmap that stores the custom icons (UserImages.bmp) in a 24-bit format.
 The printer settings used for printouts are unreliable.

Features 
 Custom color schemes
 Wrapping around of your existing projects
 Different JDK profiles can be used
 Quick code writing via project templates
 Easy project viewing with the class browser
 Debugging with an easy, intuitive interface. No command-line prompts necessary
 Wizards help you cut to the chase writing your project, quickly and easily
 Automatic Classpath configuration
 UI customization (similar to Microsoft Visual Studio)
 The run-time environment can run your application as an applet, in a JUnit environment or in a command-line window
 JCreator's IDE does not require a Java Runtime Environment to execute, which may make it faster than Java-based IDE's
Robot packages can be uploaded, also by using inheritance the users can create new variables, objects and classes as well as methods

(derived from here)

Pro vs LE 
Some of the features missing from the freeware edition (Version 3) include:
 Code Templates
 Ant Viewer
 Bean Properties
 Code Identifier tooltip
 Code Completion
 Code Parameter tooltip list;
 Source Code Navigation
 Debugger
 JSP Tag and Scriplet Code Completion
 CVSSupport

References

External links
 JCreator 
 JCreator Community Forum
 JCreator download page
 Feature list
Programming with Robots

Integrated development environments
Java development tools